The secretary of the Cabinet (or Cabinet secretary) is a senior public servant in New Zealand. The Cabinet secretary usually serves concurrently as the clerk of the Executive Council. The secretary is responsible for the impartial recording of Cabinet decisions, and as clerk of the Executive Council they are also a liaison between the Cabinet and the governor-general. The secretary is also responsible to Cabinet as a collective for ensuring the confidentiality of Cabinet proceedings, and the impartial and effective operation of the Cabinet system. The current Cabinet Secretary and Clerk of the Executive Council is Rachel Hayward.

Responsibilities and powers
The Cabinet secretary is a public servant who heads the Cabinet Office, which while a part of the Department of Prime Minister and Cabinet, it is autonomous. The post has two principal roles that are designed to ensure continuity of constitutional government and provide support to administer the operations of the New Zealand Government.

As the clerk of the Executive Council, they act on behalf of the governor-general by providing a channel of communication and liaison between the government and the governor-general, providing advice to the governor-general, and administering the New Zealand royal honours system.

The Cabinet secretary is the steward of the Cabinet Manual. This document sets out clear descriptions of the key constitutional conventions observed in New Zealand, and describes the underlying structures, principles and values of government.  The Cabinet Manual is endorsed at the first Cabinet meeting of a new government, to provide for the orderly re-commencement of the business of government.

While similar to its British equivalent, the role has some key differences. For example, authority over the civil service is held by the State Services Commissioner, a separate official.  The Cabinet secretary is highly influential in determining the Government decisions on public law and through their constitutional advice to Cabinet.

History

After the separation of New Zealand as a distinct Crown Colony from New South Wales New Zealand formed its first responsible government in 1856. By 1863 Cabinet had largely taken over the function of the Colonial Executive Council. This led to the establishment of the secretary to the Cabinet in 1864 with future colonial secretary William Gisborne being appointed.

The role required extensive knowledge of the colony and its constitutional underpinnings. In 1889 the role of clerk of the Executive Council was also assumed by then Cabinet Secretary Alexander Willis. This protocol has been largely abided by since, with an only exception occurring at the conclusion of Cecil Jeffery's tenure in 1945 for a period of 24 years when Foss Shanahan assumed the role of Cabinet secretary and held the position until 1955. During this time, the role of clerk of the Executive Council was held briefly by William Harvey and then Thomas Sherrard. The roles would not be combined again until the departure of Cabinet Secretary Albert Perry in 1969 when the then Clerk of the Executive Council, Peter Brooks, assumed the role of Cabinet Secretary. In 1979 Cabinet Secretary Patrick Millen collated and published the first Cabinet Manual, which centralised the practise and procedures of Cabinet into a single document.

When the Prime Minister's Department was established in 1926 then Cabinet Secretary Frank Thomson initially was appointed as its head. Eventually the Head of the Prime Minister's Department would become a separate role, although until the 1960s the roles were interchangeable.

Despite the name, it was not initially a codified practice to have the secretary present at Cabinet meetings, and this was usually at the discretion of the prime minister. During the first 84 years, if the secretary was not present, minutes were rarely taken and the prime minister or another senior minister noted Cabinet's decisions on a Schedule for subsequent recording and distribution by the secretary. Starting in 1946, Foss Shanahan sought to make a number of significant administrative changes to the way Cabinet operated which initially saw him joining Cabinet informally in 1948 and the presence of the secretary was formally adopted in December 1949. The Cabinet secretariat was set up by Shanahan for the purpose of co-ordination, continuity of action, and review, and to enable the smooth functioning of the work of Cabinet. As Cabinet deliberations are often investigatory or preliminary to action in other organs of Government, they are often informal. While ministers may remain anonymous in their advocacy or opposition to issues discussed, the Cabinet secretariat would record the agreed action.

Recent holders of the post have gone on to have successful public service careers.  Marie Shroff served in the role from 1987 until 2003 and went on to be the Privacy Commissioner. and then chair the New Zealand Electoral Commission.  Rebecca Kitteridge served in the role from 2008 until 2013 and went on to be the director of the New Zealand Security Intelligence Service.

List of Cabinet secretaries

List of Clerks of the Executive Council Prior to 1862

See also
 Executive Council (Commonwealth countries)
 Cabinet secretary

References

External links
Executive Council
Cabinet Manual

Officers of the Parliament of New Zealand
1856 establishments in New Zealand